Philosophy Today is an international peer-reviewed journal that reflects the current questions, topics and debates of contemporary philosophy, with a particular focus on continental philosophy.

The journal is especially interested in original work at the intersection of philosophy, political theory, comparative literature, and cultural studies. It seeks to provoke discussion and debate among various intellectual traditions, including critical theory, phenomenology, hermeneutics, feminism, and psychoanalysis. The journal provides space for reviews, as well as short translations of the works of contemporary philosophical figures originally published in other languages. It publishes special issues dedicated to particular topics, and for many years published Selected Studies in Phenomenology and Existential Philosophy in cooperation with the Society for Phenomenology and Existential Philosophy (SPEP). It has a Level 1 classification from the Publication Forum of the Federation of Finnish Learned Societies. and a SHERPA/RoMEO "green" self-archiving policy.

Philosophy Today is owned by the Philosophy Department of DePaul University and published on its behalf by the Philosophy Documentation Center.

Indexing

Philosophy Today is abstracted and indexed in the following bibliographic databases:

See also 
 List of philosophy journals

References

External links 
 

English-language journals
Philosophy journals
Publications established in 1957
Quarterly journals
Contemporary philosophical literature
Philosophy Documentation Center academic journals
Continental philosophy literature